Presidential elections were held in Kiribati on 17 February 1983. The result was a victory for incumbent Ieremia Tabai, who won 49.6% of the vote. Voter turnout was 69.3%.

Results

References

Kiribati
1983 in Kiribati
Presidential elections in Kiribati
Non-partisan elections
Election and referendum articles with incomplete results